Events from the year 1945 in Taiwan, Empire of Japan.

Incumbents

Central government of Japan
 Prime Minister: Kuniaki Koiso, Kantarō Suzuki

Taiwan
 Governor-General – Rikichi Andō

Events

May
 31 May – Taihoku Air Raid.

August
 18 August – Indian nationalist leader Subhas Chandra Bose died in a plane crash at Taihoku (Taipei).

Births
 20 October – Shih Shu-Ching, writer.

Deaths
 24 April – Huang Shihui, 45, writer.

References

 
Years of the 20th century in Taiwan